Allen Ray McNeill (born September 28, 1951) is a former Republican member of the North Carolina House of Representatives. He represented the 78th district (including constituents in Randolph and Moore counties) from 2012 to 2023.

Committee assignments

2021-2022 Session
Appropriations (Vice Chair)
Appropriations - Justice and Public Safety (Chair)
Pensions and Retirement Committee (Chair)
Judiciary II (Vice Chair)
Election Law and Campaign Finance Reform
Transportation

2019-2020 session
Appropriations (Vice Chair)
Appropriations - Justice and Public Safety (Chair)
Pensions and Retirement (Chair)
Judiciary 
Election Law and Campaign Finance Reform
Transportation

2017-2018 session
Appropriations (Vice Chair)
Appropriations - Justice and Public Safety (Chair)
Pensions and Retirement (Chair)
Judiciary I
Transportation
Commerce and Job Development
Education - Community Colleges

2015-2016 session
Appropriations
Appropriations - Justice and Public Safety (Vice Chair)
Pensions and Retirement (Chair)
Education - Community Colleges (Chair)
Judiciary I
Transportation
Commerce and Job Development
State Personnel

2013-2014 session
Appropriations
Judiciary
State Personnel
Agriculture
Government
Elections

Electoral history

2020

2018

2016

2014

2012

References

Living people
1951 births
21st-century American politicians
Republican Party members of the North Carolina House of Representatives